The Russian Special Forces University is a private university in Chechnya, devoted to the training of special forces.

History
In 2013, the Head of the Chechen Republic, Ramzan Kadyrov. proposed creation of a multifunctional complex in Russia to combine modern methods and techniques of training in special tactical disciplines. The university was founded as a private company with its construction project curated by Deputy Head of National Guard of Russia in Chechen Republic Daniil Martynov.

Instructors team
The university's instructor team of certified specialists, led by Daniil Martynov, has experience in the preparation and execution of special operations. Some of the instructors are veterans of the famous counter-terrorism task force group «Alpha» of the Russian Federal Security Service, many of them with state awards for completed operations. Group of instructors are currently officers of Russian National Guard in the Chechen Republic, while the department itself was formed based on Department of National Guard of Russia in Chechen Republic. Department specialists are able to carry out complicated missions in mountainous and forested areas, in severe climate conditions, in the North Pole, in the desert, or under water. Instructors share their extensive experience with other special forces troops of Russia as well as friendly states.

Infrastructure
The large-scale university project is located on the territory of over 400 hectares in the city of Gudermes. It encompasses a multi-purpose complex of 95 buildings and facilities.

Shooting premises

Provision of special-tactical and shooting training is the main focus of the university's activity.

Tactical pond
Professional scuba divers who will practice in the pond have the necessary conditions for underwater shooting, water-to-surface shooting, gearless insertion into the water, and activities related to vessel release from the pirates.

Sporting center

The Russian University of Spetsnaz has extensive sporting facilities.

Airborne training
The university's facilities for airborne training includes concrete runway with length  and drop zone. Aerodynamic complex building is intended for paratroopers training in vertical aerodynamic tunnel  in diameter.

Training Programs
The whole academic process at the university is organized that the whole infrastructure of the university is engaged both for applied military as well as for sport civil directions.

Achievements

Maneuvers at the North Pole

In April 2016, the team composed of the Russian National Guard Troops "Flying Squad" members, who were trained at a special program developed by the university's instructors with the support from the Russian Geographic Society, held unique military tactical training in the Arctic. Under the guidance from the instructors, the team landed on the North Pole three times to practice different methods of special-purpose training in severe Arctic conditions over the course of three weeks. The trainees proved that they can fulfill tasks of any complexity in the extreme conditions in any part of the planet. This training provided methodological material and practical experience in relation to special operations drilling in the Polar conditions.

Victory at Special Forces World Championship

In 2015, Russian team, prepared by the training staff, won the title of winner at the Special Forces World Championship in Jordan. The competition held in Jordan welcomed 43 teams from 19 countries.

"Chaborz" Buggy Production Startup

In March 2017 the university's instructors team guided the production of the first combat buggies «Chaboz M-3» in Chechnya. The features of the vehicle include light construction, high cross-country ability and multifunctionality. Buggy is intended for transportation of troops and cargoes in heavy-going regions and off-road with high speed and high ride comfort. Thanks to these new vehicles forces in the course of special operations can quick strike militants' positions in forests, mountains and settlements and retreat immediately afterwards. Currently the buggies are used in training maneurves of troops in Russia, and some has been supplied to Syria.

Heroes Race

For physical and military-patriotic upbringing of the youth, in 2017 an obstacle course «Heroes Race» was built in the university.

Tactical Shooting Championship among Special Forces Units

In May 2017 in Tactical City at the university was held V Open Championship of the Chechen Republic - a competition for various law enforcement structures of Russia.

References 

Special forces of Russia
Private universities and colleges
Universities in Russia
Military academies of Russia
Education in Chechnya
2013 establishments in Russia
Educational institutions established in 2013